Grandville Township is one of eleven townships in Jasper County, Illinois, USA.  As of the 2010 census, its population was 372 and it contained 165 housing units.

Geography

Cities, towns, villages
 Yale

Unincorporated towns
 Advance at 
(This list is based on USGS data and may include former settlements.)

Adjacent townships
 Johnson Township, Clark County (northeast)
 Licking Township, Crawford County (east)
 Hunt City Township (south)
 Crooked Creek Township (west)
 Crooked Creek Township, Cumberland County (northwest)

Cemeteries
The township contains these seven cemeteries: Backbone, Bethel, Chapman, Debord, Leamon/Walnut, McFadden and Yale.

Major highways
  Illinois Route 49

Demographics

School districts
 Casey-Westfield Community Unit School District 4c
 Jasper County Community Unit School District 1

Political districts
 Illinois' 19th congressional district
 State House District 108
 State Senate District 54

References
 
 United States Census Bureau 2007 TIGER/Line Shapefiles
 United States National Atlas

External links
 City-Data.com
 Illinois State Archives

Townships in Jasper County, Illinois
1859 establishments in Illinois
Populated places established in 1859
Townships in Illinois